The first government of Francesc Antich was formed on 28 July 1999, following the latter's election as President of the Balearic Islands by the Parliament of the Balearic Islands on 23 July, as a result of the pact between centre and left-of-centre parties led by the Socialist Party of the Balearic Islands (PSIB-PSOE) after the 1999 regional election.

Investiture

Council of Government

Notes

References

Cabinets established in 1999
Cabinets disestablished in 2003
Cabinets of the Balearic Islands